Nagod or Nagaud is a town and a nagar panchayat in Satna district in the Indian state of Madhya Pradesh. It is the administrative headquarters of Nagod Tehsil.It is believed that it was a small state owned by an oil-pressing people, known as 'Teli', who were exiled by the Pratiharas. Pratiharas originally came from Kannauj and belong to Agnikula Rajput.

Origin
Nagod derives its name from Nagdev meaning town or city.

Geography
It has an average elevation of 330 metres (1,082 feet). Nagod is near to the district headquarters at Satna and is well-connected by roads. The Amarna river flows near the town's fort.

Princely history
Nagod was formerly the capital of a princely state of British India, Nagod State. The state was founded in 1344, and until the 18th century was known as Unchahara from the name of its original capital.

Demographics
 India census, Nagod had a population of 22,568. Males constitute 53% of the population and females 47%. Nagod has an average literacy rate of 68%, higher than the national average of 59.5%: male literacy is 76%, and female literacy is 60%. In Nagod, 16% of the population is under 6 years of age.

See also
Nagod (Vidhan Sabha constituency)

References

Cities and towns in Satna district
1344 establishments in Asia
14th-century establishments in India
Satna